Sandy Paterson may refer to:

 Sandy Paterson (football manager) (died 1933), Scottish football manager
 Sandy Paterson (rugby union) (1885–1933), New Zealand rugby union player

See also
 Alexander Paterson (disambiguation)
 Sandy Patterson (1916–1997), Australian rules footballer